Hardcore Adrenaline are a series of compilation albums released by Gut TV.

Releases

Compilation album series
Electronic compilation albums
2007 compilation albums